Truncated binary encoding is an entropy encoding typically used for uniform probability distributions with a finite alphabet. It is parameterized by an alphabet with total size of number n. It is a slightly more general form of binary encoding when n is not a power of two.

If n is a power of two, then the coded value for 0 ≤ x < n is the simple binary code for x of length log2(n).
Otherwise let k = floor(log2(n)), such that 2k < n < 2k+1
and let u = 2k+1 − n.

Truncated binary encoding assigns the first u symbols codewords of length k and then assigns the remaining n − u symbols the last n − u codewords of length k + 1. Because all the codewords of length k + 1 consist of an unassigned codeword of length k with a "0" or "1" appended, the resulting code is a prefix code.

History 

Used since at least 1984, phase-in codes, also known as economy codes,
are also known as truncated binary encoding.

Example with n = 5
For example, for the alphabet {0, 1, 2, 3, 4}, n = 5 and 22 ≤ n < 23, hence k = 2 and u = 23 − 5 = 3. Truncated binary encoding assigns the first u symbols the codewords 00, 01, and 10, all of length 2, then assigns the last n − u symbols the codewords 110 and 111, the last two codewords of length 3.

For example, if n is 5, plain binary encoding and truncated binary encoding allocates the following codewords. Digits shown struck are not transmitted in truncated binary.

It takes 3 bits to encode n using straightforward binary encoding, hence 23 − n = 8 − 5 = 3 are unused.

In numerical terms, to send a value x, where 0 ≤ x < n, and where there are 2k ≤ n < 2k+1 symbols, there are u = 2k+1 − n unused entries when the alphabet size is rounded up to the nearest power of two. The process to encode the number x in truncated binary is: if x is less than u, encode it in k binary bits; if x is greater than or equal to u, encode the value x + u in k + 1 binary bits.

Example with n = 10
Another example, encoding an alphabet of size 10 (between 0 and 9) requires 4 bits, but there are 24 − 10 = 6 unused codes, so input values less than 6 have the first bit discarded, while input values greater than or equal to 6 are offset by 6 to the end of the binary space. (Unused patterns are not shown in this table.)

To decode, read the first k bits. If they encode a value less than u, decoding is complete. Otherwise, read an additional bit and subtract u from the result.

Example with n = 7
Here is a more extreme case: with n = 7 the next power of 2 is 8, so k = 2 and u = 23 − 7 = 1:

This last example demonstrates that a leading zero bit does not always indicate a short code; if u < 2k, some long codes will begin with a zero bit.

Simple algorithm 

Generate the truncated binary encoding for a value x, 0 ≤ x < n, where n > 0 is the size of the alphabet containing x. n need not be a power of two.  
string TruncatedBinary (int x, int n)
{
	// Set k = floor(log2(n)), i.e., k such that 2^k <= n < 2^(k+1).
	int k = 0, t = n;
	while (t > 1) { k++;  t >>= 1; }

	// Set u to the number of unused codewords = 2^(k+1) - n.
	int u = (1 << k + 1) - n;

	if (x < u)
        return Binary(x, k); 
    else
        return Binary(x + u, k + 1));
}
The routine Binary is expository; usually just the rightmost len bits of the variable x are desired.
Here we simply output the binary code for x using len bits, padding with high-order 0s if necessary.
string Binary (int x, int len)
{
	string s = "";
	while (x != 0) {
		if (even(x))
            s = '0' + s;
		else  s = '1' + s;
		
		x >>= 1;
	}
	while (s.Length < len)
        s = '0' + s;
	return s;
}

On efficiency 
If n is not a power of two, and k-bit symbols are observed with probability p, then (k + 1)-bit symbols are observed with probability 1 − p. We can calculate the expected number of bits per symbol  as

 

Raw encoding of the symbol has  bits. Then relative space saving s (see Data compression ratio) of the encoding can be defined as

 

When simplified, this expression leads to

 

This indicates that relative efficiency of truncated binary encoding increases as probability p of k-bit symbols increases, and the raw-encoding symbol bit-length  decreases.

See also
 Benford's law
 Golomb coding

References

Lossless compression algorithms